Dmitry Andreevich Artyukhov (born 7 February 1988) is a Russian politician who has served as the Governor of Yamalo-Nenets Autonomous Okrug since 29 May 2018. As of May 2018, he is the youngest head of a federal subject in Russia.

Since July 2022, Artyukhov is under personal sanctions introduced by the United Kingdom as he supported the Russian invasion of Ukraine. In August of the same year, Canada also included him in its list of sanctions. 

Artyukhov is married.

In 2021, Artyukhov 's official income was 26 409 000 rubles. His wife owned 15 076 000 rubles.

References

External links
Official Website

1988 births
People from Yamalo-Nenets Autonomous Okrug
United Russia politicians
21st-century Russian politicians
Governors of Yamalo-Nenets Autonomous Okrug
Living people
21st-century Russian economists
Tyumen State University alumni
Sanctioned due to Russo-Ukrainian War